is a platform game created by Sun Electronics. In 1983, it was published in arcades by Sun in Japan and Atari, Inc. in North America. The player assumes the role of an adventurous Arabian prince whose goal is to rescue the princess from her palace. During his quest, the prince will sail seas, crawl through caves, and fly magic carpets.

Gameplay

Release
In magazine advertisements, Arabian was promoted by Eric Ginner, the world record holder for Millipede and Liberator at the time. Ginner later co-created the PlayStation game Gubble.

Reception 
In Japan, Game Machine listed Arabian on their July 15, 1983 issue as being the fifth most-successful new table arcade unit of the month. In the United States, it had sold at least 1,950 arcade cabinets by July 1983.

Legacy
Super Arabian was re-released in a two-in-one Sony PlayStation game, Memorial Series Sunsoft Vol.1, which also included Ikki. Super Arabian, is one of the video games was adapted by Manga titled , published in the Gamest Comics collection from April 1999.

Tales of the Arabian Nights by Interceptor Software had many similarities to Arabian. It was published in 1984/5 for the Acorn Electron, Amstrad CPC, BBC Micro, Commodore 64, and ZX Spectrum.
 
The game was "re-released" for Nintendo Switch as part of the HAMSTER Arcade Archives series in October 2020.

References

External links
Memorial Series: SunSoft Vol. 1 webpage
Arabian at Arcade History

1983 video games
Sunsoft games
Arcade video games
Atari arcade games
Nintendo Entertainment System games
Nintendo Switch games
PlayStation 4 games
Platform games
Video games developed in Japan
Video games based on Arabian mythology
Works based on One Thousand and One Nights

Hamster Corporation games